Eunice Gibbs Allyn (Gibbs; pen names, (multiple); 1847 – June 30, 1916) was an American correspondent, author, songwriter, illustrator, and painter. She intended to become a teacher, but her mother dissuaded her so she remained at home, entering into society, and writing in a quiet way for the local papers while using various pen names in order to avoid displeasing one of her brothers, who did not wish to have a "bluestocking" in the family.

Allyn served as the Washington correspondent for the Chicago Inter Ocean, as well as a writer for the St. Louis Globe-Democrat and the New York World. She won distinction as an artist and lecturer. For eight years, she served as president of the Dubuque branch of the Woman's Christian Temperance Union (WCTU).

Early life and education
Eunice Eloisae Gibbs was born in 1847, in Brecksville, Ohio, a suburb of Cleveland, Ohio. Her father, Dr. Sidney Smith Gibbs, hailed from Schoharie County, New York, and her mother, Eunice Lucinda Newberry, was from St. Lawrence County, New York. Dr. Gibbs was practicing medicine in Brecksville when he married Miss Newberry, who was a successful teacher. He was a relative of the Anglican cleric, wit, and writer, Sydney Smith. Allyn was a niece of Mary Newbury Adams. Allyn's mother was a cousin of Harriet Bishop.

The family consisted of four children, of whom Eunice was the third. Adrian Hoxey Gibbs was a brother. After various changes of climate in search of health, Dr. Gibbs died young. The mother and children then moved from Jackson, Michigan, to Cleveland, where Eunice was graduated with honors from the high school.

Career
Allyn intended to become a teacher, but her mother dissuaded her and she remained at home, entering into society and writing quietly for the local papers. Her articles were signed using various pen names in order to avoid displeasing one of her brothers, who did not wish to have a "bluestocking" in the family. Her first published poems appeared in the Cleveland Plain Dealer, when she was only thirteen years old. Besides composing poems for recitation in school, she often wrote songs, both words and music, when she could not find songs suited to various occasions.

In 1873, she married Glarence Gilman Allyn (1850–1911), of Nyack, New York. After spending several years at Nyack, New London, Connecticut, and Auburn, New York, they moved to Dubuque, Iowa. Before her marriage she gained valuable experience as Washington correspondent of the Chicago Inter Ocean, a position which she filled for a year, during which time she also wrote numerous articles for the St. Louis Globe-Democrat, the New York World, and before and since marriage, for various New York City, Boston, Indianapolis, Philadelphia, and Chicago journals. She was a pointed, incisive writer, and all her work, prose or poetry, had an aim, a central thought.

Published in 1909 by Cochrane Publishing Co., The Cats' Convention was reviewed by The New York Times and Watson's Jeffersonian Magazine. The book is illustrated with drawings of many cats of various styles, some beautiful and others ugly, all created by Allyn. The Cats' Convention is included in the Iowa Collection, Historical Department of the State Historical Society of Iowa. 388

Allyn won distinction as an artist. Several of her landscape paintings hung at the 1904 St. Louis World's Fair. In 1910, one of her paintings was hung with the permanent collection in the Art Room of Dubuque's Carnegie-Stout Public Library.

Personal life
In Dubuque, she inaugurated many reforms and educational movements, doing the work, not for notoriety, but prompted by her inborn desire to do something towards lifting up humanity. Allyn was a prominent member of the Dubuque Ladies' Literary Union, and for eight years, she served as president of the Dubuque branch of the WCTU.

When she was a child, Allyn received a daguerreotype of Hole in the Day from Harriet Bishop, the cousin of Allyn's mother. In 1903, Allyn presented the daguerreotype to the Minnesota Historical Society.

In religion, she affiliated with the Episcopal Church but was also an ardent admirer of Oriental philosophy.

Eunice Gibbs Allyn died at her home in Dubuque on June 30, 1916, following a lengthy illness. Allyn and her husband are buried at the city's Linwood Cemetery. An effort began two years before her death to collect her literary works for preservation in the Iowa state historical archives.

Selected works
 "Her one star" (words and music)
 "Vesper bells" (words and music)
 "The King of all painters", 1898 (words and music)
 "The Thanksgiving hymn of the Republic", 1898 (words and music) 
 "One thousand smiles", 1898 
 "The Evolution of the Greek Flat", 1907
 "My Spirit Wife", 1909 (short story)
 The Cats' Convention, 1909

References

Bibliography

External links
 
 

1847 births
1916 deaths
19th-century American women writers
19th-century American journalists
19th-century American women musicians
19th-century pseudonymous writers
20th-century American women
20th-century American painters
People from Brecksville, Ohio
People from Dubuque, Iowa
American women journalists
Woman's Christian Temperance Union people
American women songwriters
American women illustrators
American women painters
American landscape painters
Painters from Iowa
Writers from Iowa
Pseudonymous women writers
Wikipedia articles incorporating text from A Woman of the Century